Darreh Badu (also Romanized as Darreh Bādū; also known as Darreh Bādām) is a village in Bakesh-e Yek Rural District, in the Central District of Mamasani County, Fars Province, Iran. At the 2006 census, its population was 69, in 13 families.

References 

Populated places in Mamasani County